Acridoderes is a genus of grasshoppers in the subfamily Cyrtacanthacridinae with species found in Africa.

Species 
The following species are recognised in the genus Acridoderes:
 Acridoderes arthriticus (Serville, 1838)
 Acridoderes coerulans (Karny, 1907)
 Acridoderes crassus Bolívar, 1889
 Acridoderes laevigatus Bolívar, 1911
 Acridoderes renkensis (Karny, 1907)
 Acridoderes sanguinea (Sjöstedt, 1929)
 Acridoderes strenuus (Walker, 1870)
 Acridoderes uvarovi (Miller, 1925)

References 

Acrididae